Danie Gerber (born 14 April 1958 in Port Elizabeth, Union of South Africa) is a former South African rugby union player, who played for South Africa between 1980 and 1992. He played mainly at inside or outside centre, but also on the wing. 

His international career was severely limited because of South Africa's sporting isolation caused by apartheid. 
He won only 24 caps for South Africa (scoring 19 tries), despite playing internationally for 12 years. However despite this, in 2007 he was inducted into the International Rugby Hall of Fame.

Early life

Gerber initially played football and cricket at school level, but accelerated quickly when starting rugby, playing for SA schools.

Rugby career

In South African domestic rugby Gerber played 115 games for Eastern Province, 40 for Western Province and 24 for Orange Free State. 

Gerber's international career of games played and points scored:

 In 1980, he played two tests against the South American Jaguars (a team mainly made up of Argentine players but also included a few Uruguayan, Chilean, Paraguayan and Brazilian players) in Montevideo and Santiago. He scored a try in each test. He also played one test against France in Pretoria without scoring any points, and one other test that year.

 In 1981, he played two tests against Ireland in Cape Town (scoring two tries) and in Durban without scoring points.  He also went on the controversial 1981 Springbok Tour of New Zealand, playing in all three tests, (Christchurch, Wellington and Auckland) without scoring any points. The infamous tour was lost by the Springboks due to a controversial penalty by the referee four minutes into injury time in the final test. (Ray Mordt scored three tries in the final test of the series.) He also played the final test of 1981 against the USA in Glenville, without scoring any points.

 In 1982, he played two tests against the South American Jaguars (again, mainly made up of Argentine players but also included a few Uruguayan, Chilean, Paraguayan and Brazilian players) scoring three tries in Pretoria and one in Bloemfontein.

 In 1984, he played two tests against England, scoring one try in his hometown, Port Elizabeth and three in Johannesburg. In this series, Gerber played outside South Africa's first ever Black player, Errol Tobias, in the series, and scored three tries in the second Test. Again the South American Jaguars toured South Africa and Gerber scored one try and one conversion in Pretoria and one try in Cape Town.

 In 1986, the New Zealand Cavaliers (a rebel tour conducted against the wishes of the NZ Rugby Union) toured South Africa, Gerber played in all four 'test' fixtures in Cape Town, Durban, Pretoria and Johannesburg and only managed one try in the Pretoria game.

 In 1992, after a long period of South African rugby isolation, Gerber played his final five test matches vs: New Zealand in Johannesburg scoring two tries, Australia in Cape Town without scoring any points, France in Lyon and Parc des Princes scoring one try in each match.  His final test was against England in Twickenham which went without scoring any points.

Test history 

 

Gerber scored 19 tries in 24 internationals, a very high strike rate for a centre.

Style of play

Gerber had very high acceleration and pace, could sidestep off either foot, break tackles, had a clear vision of space on the field, and high ball skill levels (catching, passing and kicking). He was also very solid in defence.

Gerber attributed his sidestep to his early football. He trained extensively (particularly running, but also swimming, circuit training and weights) and had a high fitness level, which were unusual attributes before rugby went professional.

Legacy

Gerber has been described as one of the greatest ever rugby centres. He has been named South Africa's greatest ever centre, and Naas Botha has said he is one of the greatest ever South African rugby players. Martin Johnson named him in his International Rugby Hall of Fame member's XV, and Bill McLaren's named him in his 'all time' XV.

Personal life

Gerber is married to Elsabe. 

In 2002, he had heart surgery, and his family have a pattern of high cholesterol.

See also

List of South Africa national rugby union players – Springbok no. 514

References

http://www.espnscrum.com/southafrica/rugby/player/9270.html

Living people
1958 births
South African rugby union players
South Africa international rugby union players
Rugby union centres
World Rugby Hall of Fame inductees
Eastern Province Elephants players
Western Province (rugby union) players
Rugby union players from Port Elizabeth